Bryant Robert Burns (born 24 March 1929) is a former Australian politician. He was a member of the Australian Labor Party (ALP) and served as a Senator for Queensland from 1987 to 1996. He was a welder by profession and was state president of the Amalgamated Metal Workers' Union (AMWU) before entering parliament.

Early life
Burns was born on 24 March 1929 in Rockhampton, Queensland, the son of Alice Charlotte (née Wassman) and Charles Robert Burns. He attended Leichhardt Ward Boys' School, leaving at the age of 13. He worked as a stockman and horsebreaker in North Queensland for three years before returning to Rockhampton. He subsequently completed an apprenticeship as a boilermaker at the Rockhampton Railway Workshops.

Career
In 1956, Burns began working as a welder for the Brisbane City Council. He later worked at the Kangaroo Point shipyard before becoming an organiser with the Boilermakers' and Blacksmiths' Society in 1969. His union was subsequently merged into the Amalgamated Metal Workers' Union (AMWU), of which he became state president in 1977.

Politics
Burns was an unsuccessful ALP candidate for the Senate at the 1984 federal election. A member of the Labor Left faction, he secured the backing of outspoken left-winger George Georges and was elevated to a winnable position on the party's ticket at the 1987 election. He was re-elected at the 1990 election and retired at the end of his term in 1996. He was a deputy whip from 1993 to 1996.

In his maiden speech, Burns vowed to "fight fervently" against the Hawke Government's privatisation initiatives. However, he ultimately voted in favour of the partial privatisation of Qantas. He supported Bob Hawke against Paul Keating in the June 1991 leadership spill, but was later publicly critical of Hawke's over the government's decision to introduce a co-payment for Medicare.

In 1994, Burns was reprimanded by the President of the Senate Michael Beahan after calling Liberal frontbencher Amanda Vanstone "fatty".

Personal life
Burns had seven children with his wife Lorraine, who died in 1974. He later remarried.

References

Australian Labor Party members of the Parliament of Australia
Members of the Australian Senate for Queensland
Members of the Australian Senate
Australian boilermakers
1929 births
Possibly living people
20th-century Australian politicians
Australian trade union leaders